Walter Kowalski is a fictional character and the protagonist of the 2008 American film Gran Torino. He was portrayed by Clint Eastwood, who also directed the film.

Character biography and creation
Walt is a misanthropic and irritable Polish-American former auto worker who becomes embroiled in a conflict involving a Hmong family and a gang. Walt had served in the Korean War and had killed a teenage North Korean soldier who had been trying to surrender to him; despite having killed numerous other enemy soldiers in the war, the teen’s death especially haunts him, and has ever since. He is a retiree who formerly worked at a Ford automobile plant, and he owns a Gran Torino he had helped assemble. He also owns an M1 Garand rifle and an M1911A1 pistol, both of which he kept from the Korean War. Walt's wife, Dorothy Kowalski, is dead by the beginning of the film.

Nick Schenk, the writer of the script of the film, said "Walt is like a lot of shop teachers and coaches that you have in school. He's the kind of guy who's just waiting for you to screw up so he can roll his eyes at you." Eastwood has said that the car is "sort of a symbol of his days with the Ford plant" and that the gun "is sort of a symbol of his days in the military. … He's clinging to the memory of the war. You'll find out when you see it, some of (the memories) are not as pleasant as others. That helps make him even tougher to get along with."

Anthony Breznican of USA Today said that even though Clint Eastwood had served in the Korean War (in a non-combat role) he "has little in common with Kowalski." Jenkins explained that Walt is "a man of action who's offended by the Catholic church's dogmatic insistence that it understands mortality better than a grizzled vet who's seen comrades die." Jenkins added that Walt also "learned firsthand that self-sacrifice is not transcendent" in a similar manner to John Bradley, the protagonist of Flags of Our Fathers, and Tadamichi Kuribayashi, the protagonist of Letters from Iwo Jima. Jenkins explained that Walt ultimately "assumes a Christ-like posture, both to save his new friends and to put Janovich in his place." John Serba of The Grand Rapids Press argues that Eastwood in Gran Torino "finds his focus on" Walt and "When Walt wields his weapons with righteous fury, Eastwood the actor shows us a damaged man suffering a horrible wartime flashback, without stating it outright." Serba argues that the "suggestiveness makes it easier to overlook the inexperience of his supporting cast and the occasionally overstated, transparent dialogue." Biancolli said that Eastwood, as Walt, "just keeps doing his Dirty Harry glare, whipping out guns real and imaginary. But it's hard not to see him as Mr. Wilson [George Everett Wilson] — Dennis the Menace's crotchety neighbor. Skinnier, hairier, no mustache."

Schenk said that he got the inspiration for Walt Kowalski from several war veterans he met while working as a clerk in a liquor store. Schenk explained that "I just knew this character well. When I was working construction, I'd meet a lot of guys like Walt Kowalski. Because I liked history, I'd always be the one that the older guys on the site would tell their stories to." He originally intended for Walt's car to be a Ford because a Ford assembly line was near Schenk's location in the Minneapolis area. He was not aware that Harry Callahan, the main character in Dirty Harry, drove a Gran Torino. Schenk said that the vehicle could have been a Crown Victoria but he preferred the sound of the name "Gran Torino." Schenk said that individuals told him that he would not be successful in selling a script that had an elderly man as the main character, and especially one who sounds like he has racist views.

Racism and intolerance

Walt holds many prejudices towards Asians because of his experience in the Korean War, and more recently because of the success of Japanese automakers (which is somewhat responsible for the struggle of Ford and other US marques, leading to the decimation of the auto industry in Michigan) and his dislike of rice burners (in contrast to traditional American muscle cars). He frequently calls the Asians in his community gooks, though his usage of the slur appears to be less insulting as the film progresses.

Todd McCarthy of Variety said that Walt's "racist mutterings, which employ every imaginable epithet for Asians, are blunt and nasty, but Eastwood grunts them out in an over-the-top way that provokes laughs, and his targets are no less sparing of him." Walt originally perceives his Hmong neighbors as being generic Asians rather than as the Hmong that they are. Mark Jenkins of National Public Radio says "He hates everything new or foreign, so much so that he growls at the modern world like a junkyard dog." Tom Charity says that the character's "racist Bunker mentality thaws" when Sue introduces him to Hmong food.

John Serba of The Grand Rapids Press says that the intolerance demonstrated by Walt "goes deeper than skin color" since he is also against stupidity, "trait that transcends superficialities". Serba adds that "his definition of unintelligent is broader than the average person's, thus, his conversations tend to become confrontations quickly, and perhaps surprisingly, to our amusement."

Morality

Wanda Teays, author of Seeing the Light: Exploring Ethics Through Movies, said that Walt originally is a "moral absolutist" who believes that values are universal and do not differ at all even if the context is different. She said that after Walt beats a gangster in retaliation for an attack on Thao Vang Lor, the gangsters retaliate by attacking Sue Lor. Teays said that this causes him to rethink his tactics.

Similarities and differences with other Eastwood characters

Tania Modleski, author of "Clint Eastwood and Male Weepies," said that "[f]or many reviewers, Gran Torino represents the final step in
Eastwood's repudiation of the Dirty Harry persona. If Unforgiven ends up being equivocal in its attitude toward violence and vigilantism, Gran Torino appears to accept the impotence of the lone avenging hero" and that the impotence "is perhaps underlined by Walt's repeated gesture of pointing his finger at villains as if it were a gun." Amy Biancolli of the Houston Chronicle said that even though Walt, an "old fart," does not have the same name as Inspector Harry Callahan, the protagonist of Dirty Harry, played by Eastwood, "there's no mistaking the rasp in his voice or the uncompromising crankiness of his Weltanschauung." Tom Charity of CNN said that Walt, "Like other Eastwood heroes before him, Walt sacrifices his independence by accepting that others depend on him." Serba said that Walt, who is "bitter, hopelessly cranky," "shares a sense of moral certainty" with Callahan, but that Walt "is infused with the wisdom and weariness" that Callahan does not have. Jenkins said that Walt is similar to Frankie Dunn, a character played by Eastwood in Million Dollar Baby.

Reception

Tania Modleski, author of "Clint Eastwood and Male Weepies," said that "by melodramatically sacrificing his life, Eastwood as Walt and as himself becomes God" because "Eastwood is in a sense resurrected by the reviewers who appear to want to immortalize him" and so "many reviewers accord him the masculine qualities that old age has threatened to take away from him." Modleski said that three female reviewers, Manohla Dargis, Ann Hornaday, and Stephanie Zacharek, "seem particularly invested in shoring up "Clint's" masculinity, denying, in a sense, the impotence that his character's failure to use violence except to beget more violence against those he would defend might appear to suggest" and that "[t]he attention they lavish on Eastwood's body is noteworthy."

Serna said that "Walt's Archie Bunker-ish sandpaper brusqueness" gives the film "a refreshing, if not outright surprising, levity." Jenkins argued that Walt "is just not convincing, even as a semi-comic character" because the racism espoused by Walt "is as one-dimensional as his reluctant heroism". Peter Howell of the Toronto Star said that Eastwood "transforms a stereotypical racist into a fully realized character."

See also
 List of Gran Torino characters

References

 "Gran Torino's Hmong Lead Bee Vang on Film, Race and Masculinity Conversations with Louisa Schein, Spring, 2010." (Archive) Hmong Studies Journal. (northern hemisphere) Spring 2010. Volume 11. p. 4.
 Modleski, Tania. "Clint Eastwood and Male Weepies." American Literary History. 2010. Volume 22, Issue 1. p. 136-158. . First published online on November 20, 2009.
 Schein, Louisa and Va-Megn Thoj. "Gran Torino’s Boys and Men with Guns: Hmong Perspectives." (Archive) Hmong Studies Journal. Volume 10. p. 25-26. Retrieved on March 16, 2012.
 Teays, Wanda. Seeing the Light: Exploring Ethics Through Movies. John Wiley & Sons, March 29, 2012. , .

Notes

Drama film characters
Fictional characters from Michigan
Fictional characters from Detroit
Film characters introduced in 2008
Fictional Korean War veterans
Male characters in film
Fictional Polish-American people